James Michael Jeffcoat (born August 3, 1959), is an American former professional baseball player and also a former coach who pitched in Major League Baseball (MLB) from 1983 to 1985, 1987 to 1992, and 1994. He played college baseball for Louisiana Tech.

Coaching career
Jeffcoat was the head coach of Texas Wesleyan University from 2002 to 2018. On March 1, 2018, an email written by Jeffcoat to a potential recruit began circulating. In the email, he claims that recruits from Colorado are likely to have problems with drugs and thus rejected the recruit without a proper try-out. The move was considered politically motivated due to the inclusion of the phrase "thank your liberal politicians", referring to the fact that Colorado legalized marijuana for recreational use in 2012. On the same day, Wesleyan terminated Jeffcoat's contract with the university. He is also a BAN alumni.

On December 17, 2020, Jeffcoat was hired to be the manager of the Cleburne Railroaders of the American Association of Independent Professional Baseball. On June 30, 2021, Jeffcoat retired as manager of the team.

References

External links

1959 births
Living people
American expatriate baseball players in Canada
Baseball players from Arkansas
Batavia Trojans players
Charleston Charlies players
Chattanooga Lookouts players
Cleveland Indians players
Edmonton Trappers players
Florida Marlins players
Louisiana Tech Bulldogs baseball players
Major League Baseball pitchers
Oklahoma City 89ers players
Omaha Royals players
Phoenix Firebirds players
Phoenix Giants players
San Francisco Giants players
Sportspeople from Pine Bluff, Arkansas
Texas Rangers players
Waterloo Indians players